Wesley Newton (born 27 August 1977) is an English professional darts player.

Darts career
Newton's first PDC major was the 2003 UK Open where he lost 8–6 to Mark Thomson in the last 32. He was beaten in the semi-finals of the Eastbourne Open in 2003 and 2004 and reached the first final of his career at the Golden Harvest North American Cup, but lost 4–0 to John Part. Newton qualified for the 2004 Las Vegas Desert Classic and was beaten 2–1 by Wayne Mardle in the first round. His World Championship debut came in 2005 when he lost 3–0 to Gerry Convery in the second round. His first semi-final in a major event was at the 2005 Las Vegas Desert Classic where he knocked out George Walls, Mark Walsh and Ray Carver, before losing 4–0 to Phil Taylor. Newton suffered a broken collarbone by slipping in the shower shortly after the event which kept him out of action for three months but returned to play in his first World Grand Prix, losing 3–0 in the second round to Colin Lloyd.

His second attempt in the World Championship ended with a second round 4–3 defeat to Kevin Painter. He reached the semi-finals of the Las Vegas Desert Classic for the second successive year but was denied a place in the final as John Part beat him 4–2. Newton's form saw him make his debut in the World Matchplay but he could only average 82.38 as Part comfortably beat him 10–2.

Newton lost in the second round of the World Championship again in 2007 this time 4–2 against Colin Osborne. In June, at a Players Championship event at Hayling Island he reached his first final on the PDC Pro Tour but was whitewashed 3–0 by Terry Jenkins. He couldn't translate his form into the major events, however, as he only reached the last 16 once which came in Las Vegas where he lost 8–7 to Jenkins.

Newton suffered a 3–0 first round exit in the 2008 World Championship to qualifier Jamie Caven. He won the Wildcard Qualifier for the 2008 Grand Slam of Darts, beating Colin McGarry in the final. He was drawn into Group F with Terry Jenkins, Colin Lloyd and American Darin Young where Newton defeated Lloyd and Young in his first two games to stand a great chance of qualifying for the knockout stages. However, Newton would go on to lose to Jenkins 0–5 and Young beat Lloyd to pip him to second place and knock Newton out.

Newton entered the 2009 PDC World Championship as the number 31 seed and defeated Denmark's Per Laursen in the first round, before falling to Raymond van Barneveld in round two. After the tournament, he fell outside the top 32 on the PDC Order of Merit, eventually dropping as low as 36th. Newton won the WDF-ranked Las Vegas Open on 25 January 2009.

Newton made the second round of the 2010 World Championship after defeating Jarkko Komula in the first round 3–0. However, he came up against an in-form Adrian Lewis in the second round, falling to a 2–4 defeat.
On the weekend of 7/8 November 2010, Newton won two Players Championship tournaments in the same weekend, only the fifth player to do so. This followed qualifying for the Grand Slam of Darts on the evening of 6 November. As a result of his double win, Newton broke into the top 16 in the Order of Merit for the first time in his career. At the Grand Slam, he was knocked out in the group stage after defeating Michael van Gerwen and losing to Ted Hankey and Phil Taylor.

2011
Newton continued his progress at the 2011 World Championship, defeating Darin Young, Brendan Dolan and Mensur Suljović on the way to the quarter-finals. He then led Terry Jenkins 4–3 in his quarter-final, before Jenkins fought back to win 5–4. In March 2011, Newton moved into the top eight of the PDC Order of Merit, following a win in a Pro Tour event in Crawley.

At the 2011 UK Open, Newton progressed to his first televised final. On the way to the final, he beat John Henderson, Michael van Gerwen, Raymond van Barneveld, Dave Chisnall and Denis Ovens, but succumbed to James Wade losing 8–11. As a result of his run to the final, he qualified for the 2011 Grand Slam of Darts by right. After the UK Open, it was announced that Newton had appointed three-time world finalist Peter Manley as his manager.

At the 2011 World Matchplay, Newton beat Andy Smith in the first round 10–2, making it past the first round for the first time in the tournament. Newton then beat Justin Pipe 13–8 in the second round, hitting a 9-darter, before losing 5–16 to Phil Taylor in the quarter-finals.

2012
Newton breezed through the first round of the 2012 World Championship by whitewashing Kurt van de Rijck 3–0 and played Justin Pipe in the last 32. He won the first two sets but then seemed to become distracted by Pipe's slow style and lost the next three. Newton managed to take the match into a deciding set but could not break Pipe's throw and lost 3–4.

At the first UK Open qualifier in February, Newton beat Kim Huybrechts 6–3 in the final to receive £6,000. He also beat Kevin Dowling, Andy Brown, Robert Thornton, Jerry Hendriks and Richie Howson on the way to the final. He also won the eighth qualifier three months later with a 6–2 victory over Justin Pipe in the final. In the UK Open itself he lost to eventual winner Robert Thornton in the quarter-finals. At the World Matchplay, Newton beat James Hubbard 10–5 in the first round, before throwing the first televised nine-dart finish of his career in the 11th leg of his last 16 match against Justin Pipe. However, despite being 9–7 up in the game, he went on to lose 10–13.

Newton reached his second PDC major final in September's European Championship in Mülheim, Germany. He beat Tomas Seyler, Kevin Painter and then Andy Hamilton in the quarter-finals to face his room-mate Brendan Dolan in the semis. Newton produced a superb comeback to take five successive legs from 6–9 to down to triumph 11–9, before losing to Simon Whitlock 5–11 in the final. At the World Grand Prix, he was a dart away from exiting the tournament in the first round to Ronnie Baxter, but his opponent missed and Newton went on to win 2–1 in sets, before beating Ian White 3–1 in the last 16. He once again produced a comeback in his quarter-final against Paul Nicholson, as he took the match 3–2, despite being 0–2 down. In his semi-final against Michael van Gerwen, Newton was heavily out-scored in a 1–5 defeat. Newton qualified from Group 1 of the Championship League with a 6–3 victory against Adrian Lewis, in a group that contained the top eight players in the Order of Merit. However, he finished 7th in the Winners Group, winning just two of his seven matches. Newton topped Group G in the Grand Slam of Darts with wins over Martin Phillips, Wesley Harms and Terry Jenkins to face BDO player Christian Kist in the last 16. Newton trailed 3–7, but came back to tie the match at 9–9, before failing to hold his throw to claim the win. After all 33 ProTour events of 2012 had been played, Newton finished seventh on the Order of Merit to qualify for the Players Championship Finals where he lost to Gary Anderson 4–6 in the first round.

2013
Newton dropped just one set as he cruised into the quarter-finals of the 2013 World Championship. He faced third seed James Wade and won the first two sets before losing the next four, which included four missed darts to lead 3–1. Newton produced a fightback to level the match but missed two darts to hold throw in the third leg of the deciding set and lost the next leg to exit the tournament. By reaching the final of the European Championship last year, Newton qualified for the Premier League for the first time. He could only win two matches out of his first eight and went into week nine knowing he needed to beat Andy Hamilton in order to avoid relegation. Newton lost the match 7–5 and blamed his scoring throughout the season as the reason for his early exit.

Newton won his first European Tour title in April, the European Darts Trophy in Sindelfingen, Germany, by defeating Paul Nicholson 6–5 in the final. Newton described it as the best win of his career after the match. A tough draw at the UK Open saw him beat Simon Whitlock 9–4 in the third round, before meeting Adrian Lewis. Newton threw a nine-darter to level the game at 4–4 and the match went into a last leg decider with Newton missing three darts to win, before Lewis stepped in to triumph 9–8. Both players averaged over 100 during the game. He reached the final of the fifth Players Championship by beating Michael van Gerwen 6–4 in the semi-finals, but lost 6–1 to Peter Wright. He was beaten 6–4 by Jelle Klaasen in the first round of the European Championship and squandered 5–2 and 7–4 leads over Jamie Caven in the opening round of the World Matchplay to lose 10–8.
Newton advanced to the Winners Group of the Championship League by winning Group 3 with a 6–4 success over Dave Chisnall. He qualified for the play-offs by finishing fourth in the table before losing 6–1 to Phil Taylor. Newton lost 9–4 to Van Gerwen in the quarter-finals of the Players Championship Finals.

2014
Newton reached the quarter-finals of the World Championship once more and missed two darts to take a 4–2 lead over Peter Wright. The match went into a deciding set with Newton losing it 5–3 in legs to bow out of the event via a 5–4 defeat in the quarter-finals for the third time in four years. In the Premier League, Newton won two out of his first three games, but couldn't win any of his next six to be eliminated after week nine for the second year in a row. Newton had a poor season by his standards as he failed to win a PDC tournament for the first time since 2007. He did beat Ronnie Baxter and Paul Nicholson at the World Matchplay, before losing 16–6 to Phil Taylor in the quarter-finals, but then suffered first round exits in the World Grand Prix, European Championship and the Masters and could not qualify for the Grand Slam for the first time in five years. His season did finish on a positive note at the Players Championship Finals when he knocked out Justin Pipe 6–1, Brendan Dolan and Terry Jenkins both 10–5, before succumbing to an 11–6 defeat against Adrian Lewis in the semi-finals.

2015
Newton lost the first two sets against qualifier Cristo Reyes in the opening round of the 2015 World Championship, but rallied to level at 2–2. The deciding set went to a sudden-death leg which Reyes won to produce a result referred to as one of the biggest upsets in the tournament's history. However, there was controversy after the final leg had to be restarted due to confusion over whether the players had to throw for the bull beforehand or go straight in. Both players were visibly irritated by the mistake and Newton posted a series of angry Twitter messages after the match, although he accepted that Reyes deserved to win. Newton dropped to world number 16 after the event and didn't get a wildcard for the Premier League which meant he missed out of the event for the first time since 2012. After failing to get beyond the last 16 in any event he was ranked 22nd in the world in July to miss out on qualification for the World Matchplay for the first time since 2008. In fact he could not reach the remaining major events of 2015 after being a firm fixture in them during the previous five years. He had not reached the quarter-final stage of any PDC tournament in over a year.

2016
In a rematch from last year, Newton drew Cristo Reyes in the first round of the 2016 World Championship and won the first set despite averaging just 67.31. In the fourth set Newton finished 341 in six darts to break through and went on to wrap up a 3–1 victory with an average of 77.80. In the second round he could not win a leg against James Wade until the third set in a 4–0 defeat. He qualified for the UK Open, but lost 6–4 to Rob Cross in the second round.

In July, Newton revealed his dip in form coincided with a shoulder injury, but stated that it had felt better in the last few months. He also said his confidence and form could not get any worse. Newton fell outside the top 32 in the world rankings during 2016 and, after the UK Open, failed to qualify for any of the major events. He only reached the last 16 of two Pro Tour events throughout the year. Newton stated that if he could not qualify for the 2017 World Championship it would be a disaster after he had played in the previous 12, but he failed to do so after losing 5–2 to Barrie Bates in the second round of the qualifier. He was the world number 59 after the event.

2017–18
In August, he won the inaugural Neon Newport Masters event, in a field including Gerwyn Price, former world champion Richie Burnett, and former World Championship finalists Andy Hamilton and Mark Dudbridge . In December 2017, it was confirmed that Newton would drop off the professional darts circuit after failing to retain his tour card. In 2018 he entered the PDC's Q-School qualifying event in an attempt to win back a tour card, but was unsuccessful. He is currently playing on the PDC's Challenge Tour for second-tier players.

BDO
As of March 2018 he has participated in the British Darts Organisation and is currently ranked world number 29.

He qualified for the 2019 BDO World Darts Championship, where he lost in the preliminary round to Paul Hogan.

Personal life
Newton currently resides in Fleetwood, and uses the nickname The Warrior for his matches. His younger brother Dale Newton is a former professional player and they both played in the 2006 World Championship. Newton's dad Colin is a high-level amateur player. With his close family all playing darts, he actually attributes his career to his cousin Leon, exclaiming "he used to visit every summer when we were little and teach me how to play, stand and throw correctly even though he was 5 years younger than me. I owe it all to him"

Newton and his partner Stacey have two children, Fraser Wesley Newton, and Zac Newton. In the early part of his career he juggled playing darts with his job as an accounts clerk until he turned professional in 2009.

He is a supporter of Fleetwood Town and Liverpool.

World Championship performances

PDC
 2005: First round (lost to Gerry Convery 0–3)
 2006: Second round (lost to Kevin Painter 3–4)
 2007: Second round (lost to Colin Osborne 2–4)
 2008: First round (lost to Jamie Caven 0–3)
 2009: Second round (lost to Raymond van Barneveld 1–4)
 2010: Second round (lost to Adrian Lewis 2–4)
 2011: Quarter-finals (lost to Terry Jenkins 4–5)
 2012: Second round (lost to Justin Pipe 3–4)
 2013: Quarter-finals (lost to James Wade 4–5)
 2014: Quarter-finals (lost to Peter Wright 4–5)
 2015: First round (lost to Cristo Reyes 2–3)
 2016: Second round (lost to James Wade 0–4)

BDO
 2019: Preliminary round (lost to Paul Hogan 1–3)

Career finals

PDC major finals: 2 (2 runners-up)

PDC European tour finals: (1 title)

Performance timeline

Nine-dart finishes

References

External links
New Official website
Wes Newton PDC profile

1977 births
English darts players
Living people
People from Blackpool
People from Fleetwood
Professional Darts Corporation former tour card holders
British Darts Organisation players
PDC ranking title winners
Darts players who have thrown televised nine-dart games